Ledene magnolije (meaning "Ice Magnolias") is a novel by Slovenian author Marjana Moškrič. It was first published by Cankarjeva založba in 2002. In 2005, the book was published in Croatian,  translated by Vesna Mlinarec.

Published editions

See also
List of Slovenian novels

References

Slovenian novels
2002 novels